The Revolt of Job is a 1983 Hungarian film directed by Imre Gyöngyössy and Barna Kabay. It was nominated for the Academy Award for Best Foreign Language Film.

Lackó is a Hungarian orphan whom a Jewish couple adopts.  He lives with the family until the Nazis take the parents away.

Hungary, 1943. An elderly Jewish couple, Jób and Róza, adopt an unruly non-Jewish child (Lackó) to whom they intend to pass on their wealth and knowledge before Nazi oppression engulfs Hungary.

Attending the film's opening in New York City, Gyöngyössy said that he intended the movie "as a message not only between generations but between nations".

Cast

 Ferenc Zenthe (Jób)
 Hédi Temessy (Róza)
 Péter Rudolf (Jani)
 Léticia Cano (Ilka)
 István Verebes (Rabbi hangja)
 László Gálffi (Cirkuszos)
 Gábor Fehér (Lackó)
 Nóra Görbe (Ilka hangja)
 András Ambrus (Ügyvéd)
 Sándor Oszter (Árvaház igazgatója)
 Péter Blaskó (Fiatal szomszéd)
 Flóra Kádár

See also
 List of submissions to the 56th Academy Awards for Best Foreign Language Film
 List of Hungarian submissions for the Academy Award for Best Foreign Language Film

References

External links

1983 films
Hungarian drama films
1980s Hungarian-language films
Holocaust films
1983 drama films